The Pyeongbuk Railway (Japanese: 平北鐵道株式會社, Heihoku Tetsudō Kabushiki Kaisha; Korean: 평북철도주식회사, Pyeongbuk Cheoldo Jusikhoesa) was a privately owned railway company in Japanese-occupied Korea.

History
The Pyeongbuk Railway opened its mainline, from Jeongju on the Chosen Government Railway's Gyeongseong—Sinuiju Gyeongui Line to Cheongsu on 27 September 1939 as an industrial railway to serve the Supung Hydroelectric Power Plant on the Yalu River, opening the Supung Line branch from Pupung on the mainline to the dam at the same time. At Cheongsu a bridge was built across the Yalu River to connect with the Fengshang Railway at Shanghekou, Manchukuo, and on 30 September 1940, the Pyeongbuk Railway opened the Supung Hoan Line.

After the partition of Korea the line was within the territory of the DPRK, and was nationalised by the Provisional People’s Committee for North Korea along with all other railways in the Soviet zone of occupation on 10 August 1946, becoming the P'yŏngbuk Line of the Korean State Railway.

Services
In the last timetable issued prior to the start of the Pacific War, the Pyeongbuk Railway had six daily passenger trains on the schedule, three round trips between Jeongju and Supung, and three between Cheongsu and Supung:

Rolling Stock

Four Class 4110 steam locomotives were sent from the Japanese Government Railway to the Pyeongbuk Railway after conversion to standard gauge.

Network

References

Rail transport in North Korea
Rail transport in Korea
Defunct railway companies of Korea
Korea under Japanese rule
Defunct companies of Japan